The Second Investigation Department or AOTD is a Lithuanian intelligence agency under the Ministry of National Defence. It conducts military intelligence as well as intelligence and counterintelligence in the areas of defense.

History
The origins of the institution are in the Intelligence Unit established within the Lithuanian Armed Forces on 27 October 1918. In 1923, many intelligence activities were transferred to the Ministry of the Interior forming what later became State Security Department of Lithuania. Military and defense related intelligence stayed within the military command and after 1929 the service was reorganized and named the Second Unit.

The department was reestablished in 1990 as Information Unit, later reorganized and renamed to Second Investigation Department in 1997. Its early task was to gather intelligence on Soviet military units operating in the region. Since Lithuania became a member of NATO, AOTD closely cooperates with the NATO intelligence community.

See also 
 State Security Department

References

External links
 Official website

Military intelligence agencies
Law enforcement agencies of Lithuania